Yevhen Arbuzov (born 29 August 1976) is a Ukrainian former football forward.

References

External links
 
 

1976 births
Living people
Ukrainian footballers
Association football forwards
Ukrainian expatriate footballers
Expatriate footballers in Belarus
Ukrainian Cup top scorers
FC Kryvbas-2 Kryvyi Rih players
FC Tytan Armyansk players
FC Dynamo Brest players
FC Hirnyk Kryvyi Rih players
FC Khimik Krasnoperekopsk players